Active camouflage or adaptive camouflage is camouflage that adapts, often rapidly, to the surroundings of an object such as an animal or military vehicle. In theory, active camouflage could provide perfect concealment from visual detection.
Active camouflage is used in several groups of animals, including reptiles on land, and cephalopod molluscs and flatfish in the sea. Animals achieve active camouflage both by color change and (among marine animals such as squid) by counter-illumination, with the use of bioluminescence.
Military counter-illumination camouflage was first investigated during the Second World War for marine use. More recent research has aimed to achieve crypsis by using cameras to sense the visible background, and by controlling Peltier panels or coatings that can vary their appearance.

In animals

Active camouflage is used in several groups of animals including cephalopod molluscs, fish, and reptiles. There are two mechanisms of active camouflage in animals: color change and counter-illumination.

Counter-illumination

Counter-illumination is camouflage using the production of light to blend in against a lit background. In the sea, light comes down from the surface, so when marine animals are seen from below, they appear darker than the background. Some species of cephalopod, such as the eye-flash squid and the firefly squid, produce light in photophores on their undersides to match the background. Bioluminescence is common among marine animals, so counter-illumination may be widespread, though light has other functions, including attracting prey and signaling.

Color change

Color change permits camouflage against different backgrounds. Many cephalopods including octopuses, cuttlefish, and squids, and some terrestrial amphibians and reptiles including chameleons and anoles can rapidly change color and pattern, though the major reasons for this include signaling, not only camouflage. Cephalopod active camouflage has stimulated military research in the United States.

Active camouflage by color change is used by many bottom-living flatfish such as plaice, sole, and flounder that actively copy the patterns and colors of the seafloor below them. For example, the tropical flounder Bothus ocellatus can match its pattern to "a wide range of background textures" in 2–8 seconds. Similarly, the coral reef fish, the seaweed blenny can match its coloration to its surroundings.

In research

Active camouflage provides concealment by making an object not merely generally similar to its surroundings, but effectively invisible with "illusory transparency" through accurate mimicry, and by changing the appearance of the object as changes occur in its background.

Early research

Military interest in active camouflage has its origins in Second World War studies of counter-illumination. The first of these was the so-called diffused lighting camouflage tested on Canadian Navy corvettes including . This was followed in the United States Army Air Forces with the airborne Yehudi lights project, and trials in ships of the Royal Navy and the US Navy. The Yehudi lights project placed low-intensity blue lights on aircraft. As skies are bright, an unilluminated aircraft (of any color) might be rendered visible. By emitting a small, measured amount of blue light, the aircraft's average brightness better matches that of the sky, and the aircraft is able to fly closer to its target before being detected.

Possible technologies

Active camouflage may now develop using organic light-emitting diodes and other technologies which allow for images to be projected onto irregularly shaped surfaces. Using visual data from a camera, an object could perhaps be camouflaged well enough to avoid detection by the human eye and optical sensors when stationary. Camouflage is weakened by motion, but active camouflage could still make moving targets more difficult to see. However, active camouflage works best in one direction at a time, requiring knowledge of the relative positions of the observer and the concealed object.

In 2003 researchers at the University of Tokyo under Susumu Tachi created a prototype active camouflage system using material impregnated with retroreflective glass beads. The viewer stands in front of the cloth viewing the cloth through a transparent glass plate. A video camera behind the cloth captures the background behind the cloth. A video projector projects this image on to the glass plate which is angled so that it acts as a partial mirror reflecting a small portion of the projected light onto the cloth. The retroreflectors in the cloth reflect the image back towards the glass plate which being only weakly reflecting allows most of the retroreflected light to pass through to be seen by the viewer. The system only works when seen from a certain angle.

Phased-array optics would implement active camouflage, not by producing a two-dimensional image of background scenery on an object, but by computational holography to produce a three-dimensional hologram of background scenery on an object to be concealed. Unlike a two-dimensional image, the holographic image would appear to be the actual scenery behind the object independent of viewer distance or view angle.

Military prototypes

In 2010, the Israeli company Eltics created an early prototype of a system of tiles for infrared camouflage of vehicles. In 2011, BAE Systems announced their Adaptiv infrared camouflage technology. It uses about 1000 hexagonal Peltier panels to cover the sides of a tank. The panels are rapidly heated and cooled to match either the temperature of the vehicle's surroundings, or one of the objects in the thermal cloaking system's "library" such as a truck, car or large rock.

In fiction 

Active camouflage technology, both visual and otherwise, is a commonly used plot device in science fiction stories. The Star Trek franchise incorporated the concept, and Star Trek: Voyager depicts humans using "bio-dampeners" to infiltrate a Borg Cube without the antagonists realizing they are there. The eponymous antagonists in the Predator films also use active camouflage. In many video games, such as the Halo series, Deus Ex: Human Revolution, and the Crysis series, players can obtain and use cloaking devices. In the 2002 James Bond film Die Another Day, Bond's Aston Martin V12 Vanquish is fitted with an active camouflage system.

See also 
 Cloaking device
 Cloak of invisibility
 Snow camouflage – color change with the seasons
 Stealth technology

References

External links 
 "Multi-perspective background simulation cloaking process and apparatus", United States Patent & Trademark Office
 "Scientist show off 'invisible coat'", The Sydney Morning Herald, 30 March 2003
 Phased Array Optics
 "Thermal and Visual Camouflage System Patent No 6,338,292",  United States Patent & Trademark Office

Military camouflage
Military electronics
Camouflage

fr:Camouflage (militaire)#Camouflage optique